, better known as , is a Japanese gravure idol and actress represented by Irving and her business alliance is Harmony Promotion.

Hashimoto is called by such unique catchphrases such as "Heisei no Danchi Tsuma," "Aijin ni Shitai Onna No. 1," and "Kokumin no Aijin."

Filmography

Dramas

Films

Variety

References

External links
 

Japanese gravure idols
Japanese actresses
Japanese television personalities
1984 births
Living people
Horikoshi High School alumni
Actors from Yamagata Prefecture
People from Yamagata (city)